Events in the year 1969 in Mexico.

Incumbents

Federal government
 President: Gustavo Díaz Ordaz
 Interior Secretary (SEGOB): Luis Echeverría Álvarez (until 10 November), Mario Moya Palencia (starting 11 November) 
 Secretary of Foreign Affairs (SRE): Antonio Carrillo Flores
 Communications Secretary (SCT): José Antonio Padilla Segura
 Education Secretary (SEP): Agustín Yáñez
 Secretary of Defense (SEDENA): Matías Ramos
 Secretary of Navy: Antonio Vázquez del Mercado
 Secretary of Labor and Social Welfare: Salomón González Blanco
 Secretary of Welfare: Gilberto Valenzuela/Luis Enrique Bracamontes

Supreme Court

 President of the Supreme Court: Alfonso Guzmán Neyra

Governors

 Aguascalientes:Francisco Guel Jiménez 
 Baja California: Raúl Sánchez Díaz Martell
 Campeche: Carlos Sansores Pérez
 Chiapas: José Castillo Tielemans
 Chihuahua: Oscar Flores Sánchez
 Coahuila: Braulio Fernández Aguirre/Eulalio Gutiérrez Treviño
 Colima: Pablo Silva García
 Durango: Alejandro Páez Urquidi 
 Guanajuato: Manuel M. Moreno
 Guerrero: Raymundo Abarca Alarcón/Caritino Maldonado Pérez
 Hidalgo: Carlos Ramírez Guerrero/Manuel Sánchez Vite
 Jalisco: Francisco Medina Ascencio
 State of Mexico: Juan Fernández Albarrán/Carlos Hank González
 Michoacán: Carlos Gálvez Betancourt
 Morelos: Emilio Riva Palacio
 Nayarit: Julián Gazcón Mercado
 Nuevo León: Eduardo Elizondo
 Oaxaca: Víctor Bravo Ahuja
 Puebla: Aarón Merino Fernández/Rafael Moreno Valle
 Querétaro: Juventino Castro Sánchez
 San Luis Potosí: Antonio Rocha Cordero
 Sinaloa: Alfredo Valdés Montoya
 Sonora: Faustino Félix Serna
 Tabasco: Manuel R. Mora Martínez
 Tamaulipas: Praxedis Balboa/Manuel A. Rabize	
 Tlaxcala: Anselmo Cervantes/Ignacio Bonillas
 Veracruz: Rafael Murillo Vidal
 Yucatán: Luis Torres Mesías
 Zacatecas: Pedro Ruiz González
Regent of the Federal District: Alfonso Corona del Rosal

Events

 Allende meteorite falls in Allende, Chihuahua. 
 The Universidad Regiomontana, the Autonomous University of Nayarit and the University of Monterrey are established.
 Treaty of Tlatelolco
 Non-nuclear Proliferation Treaty for Latin America and the Caribbean
 March 31: Mina de Barroterán coal mine disaster
 June 4: Mexicana Flight 704
 June 27–30: The American rock group The Doors perform four concerts in Mexico City.
 September 4: Opening of the Mexico City Metro Line 1

Awards
Belisario Domínguez Medal of Honor – María Cámara Vales

Film

 List of Mexican films of 1969

Sport

 1968–69 Mexican Primera División season 
 1969 Mexican Grand Prix 
 May 31 – June 21: 1970 FIFA World Cup 
 October 3 – 5: 1969 World Judo Championships held in Mexico City.

Births
 January 13 — Beatriz Gutiérrez Müller, Mexican writer, wife of Andrés Manuel López Obrador
January 31 — Urbano Zea, swimmer who competed in the 1988 Summer Olympics; (d. 2018)
June 17 — Claudia Pavlovich Arellano, lawyer and first female Governor of Sonora starting 2015
June 29 — Guillermo Padrés Elías, Governor of Sonora 2009-2015. Arrested for embezzlement on November 10, 2016 and released on February 2, 2019
April 21 — Carlos Mendoza Davis, lawyer and Governor of Baja California Sur starting 2015
May 9 — Benjamín Rivera, voice actor
July 9 — Eduardo Santamarina, actor
August 5 — Diego Schoening, singer, actor, television host
September 1 — Armando Araiza, actor
September 28 — Pedro Fernández, singer, songwriter, actor
October 24 — Adela Noriega, actress
Date unknown
Marco Antonio Mena Rodríguez, Governor of Tlaxcala starting 2017.
Armando Mendoza Duarte, politician.

Deaths
 September 22 – Adolfo López Mateos, 48th President of Mexico (b. 1909)

References

 
Years in Mexico
Mexico